Johann Berger (born 23 July 1999) is a German footballer who plays as a midfielder for NOFV-Oberliga Nord club Rostocker FC.

Career

Holstein Kiel II
After turning down a contract extension from Hansa Rostock in March 2019, it was announced in April 2019 that Berger would leave the club and instead join the reserve team of Holstein Kiel on a 2-year contract.

References

External links
 Profile on FuPa.de
 
 

1999 births
Sportspeople from Rostock
Footballers from Mecklenburg-Western Pomerania
Living people
German footballers
Association football midfielders
FC Hansa Rostock players
Holstein Kiel II players
Oberliga (football) players
3. Liga players
Regionalliga players